Group I of the 2021 Africa Cup of Nations qualification tournament was one of the twelve groups that decided the teams which qualified for the 2021 Africa Cup of Nations finals tournament. The group consisted of four teams: Senegal, Congo, Guinea-Bissau, and Eswatini.

The teams played against each other in home-and-away round-robin format, originally scheduled between November 2019 and September 2020.

Due to the COVID-19 pandemic, all matches of matchdays 3 and 4 scheduled for March 2020 were postponed until further notice. FIFA recommended that all June 2020 international matches (matchday 5) be postponed, and also postponed the September 2020 window (matchday 6) for CAF.

On 30 June 2020, the CAF announced the 2021 Africa Cup of Nations final tournament had been postponed from January 2021 to January 2022, without announcing the new dates of the remaining qualifiers. On 19 August 2020, the CAF announced the new dates of the remaining qualifiers, with matchdays 3 and 4 rescheduled to be played between 9–17 November 2020, and matchdays 5 and 6 rescheduled to be played between 22 and 30 March 2021.

Senegal and Guinea-Bissau, the group winners and runners-up respectively, qualified for the 2021 Africa Cup of Nations.

Standings

Matches

Goalscorers

References

External links

Group I